Stereo Skyline – EP is the second EP of American powerpop band Stereo Skyline.

The EP was removed from iTunes following the release of the band's debut album, but was later re-released without "Heartbeat", which was re-recorded for their debut album Stuck on Repeat.

It is now out of print.  Only 15,000 physical copies were produced, most of them being sold during touring or available for purchase on the band online store.

Track listing
"Shake and Shout" (3:03)
"Heartbeat" (2:45)
"Five-tens in Harlem" (2:44)
"Uptown, Get Around." (2:37)

References

2008 albums
Stereo Skyline albums